Punk or punks may refer to:

Genres, subculture, and related aspects
 Punk rock, a music genre originating in the 1970s associated with various subgenres
 Punk subculture, a subculture associated with punk rock, or aspects of the subculture such as:
 Punk fashion
 Punk ideologies
 Punk literature
 Punk visual art

Writing genres
 Cyberpunk derivatives, subgenres of speculative fiction with universes built on one particular technology that is extrapolated to a highly sophisticated level, a gritty transreal urban style, or a particular approach to social themes
 Cyberpunk, a science fiction subgenre with a computers-focused setting
 Biopunk
 Nanopunk
 Postcyberpunk
 Steampunk, a science fiction subgenre that incorporates technology and aesthetic designs inspired by 19th-century industrial steam-powered machinery
 Atompunk
 Clockpunk
 Dieselpunk
 Splatterpunk, a movement within horror fiction in the 1980s, distinguished by its graphic, often gory, depiction of violence
 Solarpunk, an emerging genre of fiction with themes of sustainability and ecology as solutions to global challenges.

People
 Punk (video game player) (born 1999), professional Street Fighter V player
 CM Punk (born 1978), American retired professional wrestler and mixed martial artist

Arts, entertainment and media
 Punks (film), a 2000 film centered on a group of LGBT African American friends
 P.U.N.K.S., a 1999 movie about a group of bullied teens who find a suit created by a scientist
 Punk (Chai album), 2019 
 Punk (Young Thug album), 2021
 "Punk", a song from the 2001 Gorillaz self-titled debut album
 "Punk", a song from the 2003 Ferry Corsten album Right of Way
 Punk (magazine), a 1970s United States punk music magazine
 The Encyclopedia of Punk, a 2006 reference work by Brian Cogan
 Punk (TV series), an American documentary television series

Other uses
 Punk (fireworks), a smoldering stick used for lighting firework fuse
 Punk, a colloquialism for the cattail reed, genus Typha
 Punkwood, rotted or fungus-infested wood which is brittle and crumbly.
Punk, an evil robot from the Mega Man series

See also
 Donny the Punk (1946–1996), United States prison reform activist
 Punk'd, an MTV hidden-camera television program